Lutjanus biguttatus, the two-spot banded snapper or two-spot snapper, is a species of marine ray-finned fish, a snapper belonging to the family Lutjanidae. It is native to the western Pacific and eastern Indian Oceans.

Taxonomy 
Lutjanus biguttatus was first formally described as Serranus biguttatus in 1830 by the French zoologist Achille Valenciennes with the type locality given as Trincomalee in Sri Lanka and Ambon Island in Indonesia. The specific name biguttatus means “two spotted” a reference to the two spots on the back underneath the dorsal fin.

Description 
Lutjanus biguttatus has a very slender, fusiform body with a snout which has a low, gently sloping profile. The preoperculum’s knob and incision are weak. In the mouth the vomerine teeth are arranged in a triangular patch, with a posterior extension, or in a rhombus shape and there are no teeth on the tongue. The caudal fin is truncate. The dorsal fin contains 11 spines and 12 soft rays while the anal fin contains 3 spines and 8 soft rays. This species has a greyish back, a wide horizontal white stripe running from the mouth to the caudal peduncle bordered on both sides by two reddish-brown stripes. There are two white spots on the back underneath the base of the dorsal fin. The juveniles are largely white with a grey back, a dark brown longitudinal  stripe along the lateral line and two indistinct white spots on the back. The maximum standard length recorded for this species is  although  is more typical.

Distribution and habitat 
Lutjanus biguttatus is found in the Indo-Pacific region. It is distributed from the Maldives and Sri Lanka through the Andaman Sea and the Malay Archipelago east as far as the Solomon Islands, north as far as the Philippines and south to Australia, although there are records from farther east in Samoa, Fiji and the Caroline Islands. In Australia it has been recorded in Western Australia from Hibernia Reef to the Scott Reef, the Ashmore Reef in the Coral Sea and off the Cape York Peninsula in northern Queensland.

Biology 
Lutjanus biguttatum is an uncommon species but will gather in aggregations of over 100 individuals, although they are frequently encountered as solitary fish. It is a predatory species which feeds largely on smaller fishes and crustaceans.

Fisheries
Lutjanus biguttatus is an important food fish in some areas, such as Sri Lanka, although it is uncommon in fish markers where it is sold fresh. It is caught using traps, hand lines and gill nets.

References

External links
 Fishes of Australia : Lutjanus biguttatus
 

biguttatus
Fauna of Queensland
Fish described in 1830
Taxa named by Achille Valenciennes